The Price of Fear is a 1928 American silent Western film directed by Leigh Jason and starring Bill Cody, Duane Thompson and Tom London.

Cast
 Bill Cody as Grant Somers
 Duane Thompson as Mary Franklin
 Tom London as 'Flash' Hardy
 Grace Cunard as Satin Sadie
 Monte Montague as Monte 
 Ole M. Ness as Michael Shane
 Jack Raymond as Toad Magee

References

Bibliography
 Munden, Kenneth White. The American Film Institute Catalog of Motion Pictures Produced in the United States, Part 1. University of California Press, 1997.

External links
 

1928 films
1928 Western (genre) films
Silent American Western (genre) films
American silent feature films
American black-and-white films
1920s English-language films
Films directed by Leigh Jason
Universal Pictures films
1920s American films